Aleksey Vladimirovich Nikolaev (born 5 September 1979 in Voronezh) is a Russian-Uzbekistan footballer currently playing for Kokand 1912 as a defender. He is an ethnic Russian.

Career
He started his player career at Qizilqum Zarafshon in 2000. In 2003-2005 he played for Pakhtakor and became three times Uzbek League champion. From 2006 to 2007 he played for Aktobe and won Kazakhstan Premier League in 2007. In 2008, he played one season for uprising uzbek club Kuruvchi.

International
He played for national team 42 matches in 2002–2008.

Honours
Pakhtakor
Uzbek League (3): 2003, 2004, 2005
Uzbek Cup (3): 2003, 2004, 2005
AFC Champions League semi-final: 2002–03, 2004

Aktobe
Kazakhstan Premier League (1): 2007
Kazakhstan Premier League runner-up (1): 2006

Bunyodkor
Uzbek League (1): 2008
Uzbek Cup (1): 2008

External links

Uzbekistan international players

1979 births
Living people
FC Shinnik Yaroslavl players
Russian Premier League players
Pakhtakor Tashkent FK players
Uzbekistani footballers
Uzbekistani people of Russian descent
Uzbekistan international footballers
2004 AFC Asian Cup players
2007 AFC Asian Cup players
Expatriate footballers in Kazakhstan
Expatriate footballers in China
FC Qizilqum Zarafshon players
FC Aktobe players
FC Bunyodkor players
Uzbekistani expatriate sportspeople in China
Shenzhen F.C. players
Chinese Super League players
Russian expatriates in China
Uzbekistani expatriate sportspeople in Kazakhstan
Russian expatriate sportspeople in Kazakhstan
FK Dinamo Samarqand players
Footballers at the 2002 Asian Games
Kazakhstan Premier League players
Association football defenders
Uzbekistan Super League players
Asian Games competitors for Uzbekistan